The Waitemata by-election was held on 19 July 1941 was caused by the death of Jack Lyon during the term of the 26th New Zealand Parliament. Mary Dreaver of the Labour Party won the by-election; she was the third woman elected to the House of Representatives.

Background and candidates
Mary Dreaver was chosen as the Labour Party candidate. Lyon's widow Alison considered but, after receiving medical advice, opted not to accept nomination to stand for the seat.

The National Party chose not to stand an official candidate for the by-election. However, William Brockway Darlow entered the contest as an "independent" National candidate. He was subsequently endorsed by the National Party for the next general election scheduled to take place later that year, but was postponed until 1943 due to World War II. Darlow had previously contested the seat in 1931 for the United Party, one of National's predecessors.

Former Auckland City Councilor Norman Douglas stood for the Labour splinter group, the Democratic Labour Party (DLP). As was predicted, the inclusion of a Democratic Labour candidate split Labour's vote. He was president of the DLP's Grey Lynn branch, secretary of the district council and a member of the DLP national executive.

Results
The following table contains the election results:

Dreaver became the third woman to enter New Zealand's House of Representatives. She was defeated in the next (1943) general election, by the National Party candidate, Henry Thorne Morton.

Notes

References

Waitemata 1941
 Waitemata by-election
Politics of the Auckland Region